Bruce Holden is a former New Zealand rower.

At the 1986 World Rowing Championships at Nottingham in the United Kingdom, he won a silver medal in the men's coxed four with Nigel Atherfold, Greg Johnston, Chris White, and Andrew Bird as cox.

References

Year of birth missing (living people)
New Zealand male rowers
Living people
World Rowing Championships medalists for New Zealand
Commonwealth Games medallists in rowing
Commonwealth Games silver medallists for New Zealand
Rowers at the 1986 Commonwealth Games
20th-century New Zealand people
Medallists at the 1986 Commonwealth Games